This article details Group E for the 2009–10 Libyan Second Division

Clubs

Results

League table

References

E